Russia participated in the Junior Eurovision Song Contest 2013 in Kyiv, Ukraine. The Russian entry was selected through a national final, organised by Russian broadcaster All-Russia State Television and Radio Company (VGTRK). The final was held on 2 June 2013. Dayana Kirillova and her song "Mechtay" won the national final, getting 12.19% of votes.

Before Junior Eurovision

National final 
On 10 March 2013, VGTRK announced that a national final would be held to select Russia' entry for the Junior Eurovision Song Contest 2013. A submission period for interested artists was opened and lasted until 1 May 2013. A professional jury selected eighteen artists and songs from the applicants to proceed to the televised national final. The selected artists and songs competed at the national final which took place on 2 June 2013 at the State Kremlin Palace in Moscow, hosted by Dmitry Guberniev and Anastasiya Chernobrovina. The winner was determined by a 50/50 combination of jury voting and televoting. The members of the jury were Grigory Gladkov, Yulia Savicheva, Larisa Rubalskaya, Gennady Gokhstein and Alexander Igudin. In addition to the performances from the competitors, the show featured guest performances by Lerika, Buranovskiye Babushki and "Domisolka" theater.

At Junior Eurovision 

During the allocation draw on 25 November 2013, Russia was drawn to close the show and perform 12th, following Malta. Russia placed 4th, scoring 106 points.

Dayana Kirillova was joined on stage by four boys from Alla Dukhova's dance troupe "Todes": Georgy, Yury, Ildar and Ilya.

In Russia, show were broadcast on Carousel with commentary by Alexander Gurevich. The Russian spokesperson revealing the result of the Russian vote was Mariya Bakhireva.

Voting

Notes

References

Junior Eurovision Song Contest
Russia
2013